The Leuckart reaction is the chemical reaction that converts aldehydes or ketones to amines by reductive amination in the presence of heat.  The reaction, named after Rudolf Leuckart, uses either ammonium formate or formamide as the nitrogen donor and reducing agent. It requires high temperatures, usually between 120 and 130 °C; for the formamide variant, the temperature can be greater than 165 °C.

History
The Leuckart reaction is named in honor of its developer, the German chemist Rudolf Leuckart (1854–1899).  He discovered that heating benzaldehyde with formamide does not produce benzylidenediformamide as anticipated, but benzylamine.  In 1891, a colleague of Leuckart at the University of Göttingen, Otto Wallach, performed further reactions using alicyclic and terpenoid ketones as well as aldehydes, demonstrating the general application.  Over the course of the past century, chemists have discovered several methods to improve the yield of the reaction and carry it out under less strenuous conditions.  Pollard and Young summarized various ways in which amines can be formed: using either formamide or ammonium formate, or both, or adding formic acid to formamide.   However, using just ammonium formate as the reagent produces the best yields. Using formamide produces low yields compared to ammonium formate but yields can be increased by using large amount of formamide, or using ammonium formate, ammonium sulfate, and magnesium chloride as catalysts.

Mechanism

Ammonium formate as reagent

Ammonium formate first dissociates into formic acid and ammonia. Ammonia then performs a nucleophilic attack on the carbonyl carbon.  The oxygen deprotonates hydrogen from nitrogen to form a hydroxyl.  The hydroxyl is protonated using hydrogen from formic acid, which allows for water molecule to leave.  This forms a carbocation, which is resonance stabilized. The compound attacks hydrogen from the deprotonated formic acid from previous step, forming a carbon dioxide and an amine.

Formamide as reagent

Formamide first nucleophilically attacks the carbonyl carbon. The oxygen is protonated by abstracting hydrogen from the nitrogen atom, subsequently forming a water molecule that leaves, forming N-formyl derivative, which is resonance stabilized.   Water hydrolyzes formamide to give ammonium formate, which acts as a reducing agent and adds on to the N-formyl derivative. Hydride shift occurs, resulting in loss of carbon dioxide.  Ammonium ion is added forming an imine and releasing ammonia. The imine goes through hydrolysis to form the amine, which is depicted in the scheme below.

Applications
A notable example of the Leuckart reaction is its use in the synthesis of tetrahydro-1,4 benzodiazepin-5-one, a molecule that is part of the benzodiazepine family.  Many compounds in this family of molecules are central nervous system suppressants and are associated with therapeutic uses and a variety of medications, such as antibiotics, antiulcer, and anti-HIV agents. Researchers were able to synthesize tetrahydro-1,4-benzodiazepin-5-ones with excellent yields and purities by utilizing the Leuckart Reaction. Researchers performed the reaction via solid-phase synthesis and used  formic acid as the reducing agent.

See also
 Eschweiler–Clarke reaction

References

Substitution reactions
Organic redox reactions
Name reactions